Thomas Amrhein (1911–??) was an American soccer midfielder. He spent thirteen seasons in the American Soccer League and was a member of the American team at the 1934 FIFA World Cup. He was born in Baltimore, Maryland.

Professional career
Amrhein began his professional career with Baltimore Canton of the American Soccer League in 1934 and played with them through the 1946-1947 season. In 1936, Canton became known as the Baltimore S.C. In 1940, Baltimore S.C. shared the National Challenge Cup title with Chicago Sparta after the two played to 0-0 and 2-2 ties. In 1942, the team became known as the Baltimore Americans.  Under this name, Amrhein and his team mates won the 1945-1946 ASL championship.

National team
Amrhein was in the U.S. team for the 1934 FIFA World Cup, but did play in the only U.S. game of the cup, a 7-1 loss to eventual champion Italy.

Amrhein was inducted into the Maryland Soccer Hall of Fame in 1981.

External links
National Soccer Hall of Fame eligibility bio

References

American soccer players
1934 FIFA World Cup players
American Soccer League (1933–1983) players
Baltimore Canton players
Baltimore S.C. players
Baltimore Americans players
Soccer players from Baltimore
1911 births
Year of death missing
Association football midfielders